The 7th Pan American Junior Athletics Championships were held in Winnipeg, Manitoba, on July 15–17, 1993.

Participation (unofficial)

Detailed result lists can be found on the "World Junior Athletics History" website.  An unofficial count yields the number of about 288 athletes from about 19 countries:  Argentina (4), Bahamas (6), Barbados (5), Bermuda (4), Brazil (12), British Virgin Islands (1), Canada (68), Chile (1), Cuba (31), Ecuador (2), Guyana (2), Jamaica (27), Mexico (34), Panama (1), Peru (1), Puerto Rico (9), Trinidad and Tobago (5), United States (74), U.S. Virgin Islands (1).

Medal summary
Medal winners are published.
Complete results can be found on the "World Junior Athletics History" website.

Men

Women

Medal table (unofficial)

References

External links
World Junior Athletics History

Pan American U20 Athletics Championships
1993 in Canadian sports
Pan American U20 Championships
International track and field competitions hosted by Canada
Pan American Junior Athletics
1993 in youth sport